Karel Dobrý (born 2 May 1969) is a Czech film, television and stage actor. He is known for playing Liet-Kynes in the Dune 2000 miniseries, and Korba in the 2003 sequel Children of Dune, and as Matthias in Mission: Impossible. He also appeared in the award-winning film The Girl of Your Dreams by Fernando Trueba.

Biography
He was born 2 May 1969 in Karlovy Vary. He was raised in Prague and spent part of his childhood living in Syria. He speaks Czech, Russian, German, and English.

Selected filmography

Elektro, má lásko (1991, TV Movie) – Orestes
La patience de Maigret (1993, TV Series) – Serveur Tropical
The Adventures of Young Indiana Jones: Attack of the Hawkmen (1995, TV Movie) – Göring
Sacred Cargo (1995) – Barishvili
Jak si zasloužit princeznu (1995) – The Strongest
UŽ (1995) – Butch
Mission: Impossible (1996) – Matthias
Let's Make an Opera (1996) – Burglar
La niña de tus ojos (1998, Short) – Leo
Plunkett & Macleane (1999) – Lewd Young Man
Spring of Life - Der Lebensborn (2000) – Odillo
Jabloňová panna (2000, TV Movie) – Prince
Frank Herbert's Dune (2000, TV Mini-Series) – Liet-Kynes
Kytice (2000) – King (segment "Zlatý kolovrat")
A Knight's Tale (2001) – Flanders King of Arms
Cabriolet (2001)
Anne Frank: The Whole Story (2001, TV Mini-Series) – Commandment
The Mists of Avalon (2001, TV Mini-Series) – Rhiannon
Ratten - sie werden dich kriegen (2001, TV Movie) – Reporter
Szach (2001) – Jakub
Černí andělé, episode "Červená karta" (2002, TV Series) – Panenka
Doctor Zhivago (2002, TV Mini-Series) – Mayakovsky
Četnické humoresky, episode "Dědic" (2002, TV Series) – Josef Kalousek
Nezvěstný (2003, TV Movie) – Hušner
Krysař (2003) – Devil / Destiny
Tajemný svícen (2003, TV Movie) – Devil
Frank Herbert's Children of Dune (2003, TV Mini-Series) – Korba
Trosečníci (2003) – Sailor (segment "Kráska a netvor")
NaPolA (2004) – SS-Arzt
Der neunte Tag (2004) – Reporter Bertram
Krev zmizelého (2005)– Brand
Hui Bůh (2006) – Ritter Ottokar
Maharal - tajemstvi talismanu (2007) – Receptionist
Skeletoni (2007, Short) – Pokálený pán
Flammen & Citronen (2008) – Seibold
Báthory (2008) – Royal Guard Commander
The Counterpart (2008, Short) – Italian Captain
Ocas ještěrky (2009) – Čihák
Jménem krále (2009) – Adalbert of Jestřebí
Strážce duší (2009, TV Series) – Richard
Janosik. Prawdziwa historia (2009) – Plavčík
We Shoot with Love (2009) – Bad Guy (segment "Pulse Beat")
Joséphine, ange gardien (2010, TV Series) – Lieutenant
Utomlennye solntsem 2 (2010) – Nemetskiy letchik
Klub osamělých srdcí (2010, TV Movie) – Jagol
Vyprávěj (2010-2012, TV Series) – Matěj Stránský
4teens (2011, TV series) – Láďa Kocman, lieutenant
Faust (2011) – Soldier
Znamení koně (2011, TV Series) – Karel Dejmek
Borgia (2011-2014, TV Series) – Giovanni Colonna
Missing (2012, TV Series) – Coffee Man
L'olimpiade nascosta (2012, TV Movie) – Pavel Kubík
In the Shadow (2012) – Muz z rozhlasu
Tigre v meste (2012) – Kužnikov
Bullet for Heydrich (The Czech Century) (2013, TV Series) – General lev prchala
České století, episode "Den po Mnichovu" (2013, TV Series) – Lev Prchala, general
Cirkus Bukowsky (2013-2014, TV Series) – Hartman, lawyer
Child 44 (2015) – Photographer
Lída Baarová (2016) – Gerhard Lamprecht, film director
Strasidla (2016) – Ignác
Zahradnictví: Rodinný prítel (2017) – Karel
The Adventurers (2017) – Yelyuk (The Buyer)
Zahradnictví: Dezertér (2017) – Karel
Milada (2017) – NKVD Agent Lichacev
Zahradnictví: Nápadník (2017) – Karel
Certoviny (2017) – Lucifer
The Catcher Was a Spy (2018) – Cold-Eyed German
Hastrman (2018) – Baron Johann Salmon de Caus
May the Lord Be with Us (2018) – Jindrich Matyás Thurn
A War Within (2018) – Doctor
The Glass Room (2019) – Láník
 Carnival Row (2023) – Pact Ambassador Anrep (6 episodes)

Theatre

National Theatre (Prague)
Tartuffe Impromptu (2014) – Tartuffe (musical performance)
Strakonický dudák (2014) – Vocilka
The Deafening Smell of White (2013) – Vincent van Gogh
Troilus and Cressida (2012) – Odysseus

Divadlo Komedie (Prague)
Kabaret Ivan Blatný (2007) – Man (musical performance)
Solingen (Rána z milosti) (2004) – Horatio
Třetí Řím (2004) – Saška
Ukřižovaná (2004) – Doctor
The Cannibals (2003) – Klaub, medicine student

Divadlo Na zábradlí (Prague)
JE SUiS (2001) – Pastor
Terasa (2001) – Maurice
Výnosné místo (2000) – Žadov
Malý Říjen (1999) – Slovák Juraj Slovák
Histrionics (1999) – Ferruccio, son
Ivanov (1998) – Eugene Lvov, young doctor (Alfréd Radok Awards for Best Play)
Táňa, Táňa (1997) – Ivanov
Cabaret (1997) – Rudolf Schultz (musical performance)
The Seagull (1994) – Boris Trigorin, novelist (Alfréd Radok Awards for Best Play)
Naši Naši furianti (1994) – Filip Dubský
Pokojíček (1993) – Jiří

Kašpar Theatre Company (Prague)
The Green Cockatoo (1992) – Baltasar
Käthchen of Heilbronn (1992) – Bedřich Veter
Cyrano de Bergerac (1991) – Christian & De Valvert

Nordic Black Theatre (Oslo, Norway)
Mr. Bojangles (1992) – Joe

Other stage works
Day of the Oprichnik (2013) – Andrej Danilovič (Studio Hrdinů), Alfréd Radok Awards for Best Actor, Cena Divadelních novin for Best Actor, nominated for Thalia Awards for Best Actor
The Church (L'Église) (2012) – Bardamu & Céline (Studio Hrdinů), nominated for Alfréd Radok Awards for Best Actor
Richard III (2012) – Duke of Buckingham (Summer Shakespeare Festival)
Buzní kříž (2012) – Lucrecia (MeetFactory, Prague)
Vánoční zázrak (2011) – Radan (Divadlo Broadway in Prague, musical performance)
Kudykam (2009) – Kudykam (Prague State Opera, musical performance)
Skočná (2009) – Louis-Ferdinand Céline (MeetFactory, Prague)
Muži malují (2009) – Hubínek (MeetFactory, Prague)
Horníci (Muži tmy) (2008) – (A Studio Rubín, Prague)
Jeanne D'Arc (2007) – Judge (Divadlo Miriam, Prague, musical performance)
Na Fidela mi nesahej! (2007) – Rene Ernesto Ariza (Experimentální prostor NoD - Klub Roxy, Prague)
The Picture of Dorian Gray (2006) – Lord Henry Wotton (Divadlo TaFantastika, Prague, musical performance)
In the Penal Colony (2005) – The Condemned Man (Divadlo Archa, Divadlo La Fabrika, Klub Roxy, acting role in opera by Philip Glass)
Sud prachu (2003) – Policeman & Mane (Činoherní studio Ústí nad Labem)
E.F.B. - Kladivo na divadlo (2004) – (Divadlo Archa, musical performance)
King Lear (2002) – Edmund, illegitimate son of Gloucester (Summer Shakespeare Festival)
Dalibor (2001) – Zdeněk (National Theatre in Prague, acting role in opera by Bedřich Smetana)
Summit Conference (1991) – Soldier (Divadlo Rokoko, Prague)

References

External links
Karel Dobrý unofficial website 

Karel Dobrý at the Czechoslovak Film Database 

Czech male film actors
Czech male television actors
Czech male stage actors
Living people
Actors from Karlovy Vary
1969 births
Czech Lion Awards winners
21st-century Czech male actors